Komal Jha is an Indian movie actress and writer. She established a career in Telugu, Kannada, Malayalam and now Hindi film industries and is known for her career transformation from being a civil engineer to an actress, and for her roles in Chinna Cinema. In addition to acting, she participates in stage shows and endorses a few brands, predominantly in South India.

Jha made her acting debut with the 2009 Bollywood movie 3 Idiots while attending college and her first Malayalam movie release in 2010, 24 Hrs. In the same year Jha left for Dubai and took a job with an international construction firm located in Dubai, UAE. In 2011, Jha was back to India for Nimbe Huli and Ramachari. Jha was also appearing in television commercials and print ads for some brands such as Axis Bank, BNP Paribas Mutual Funds and Moti Soap during this time.

Jha subsequently starred in several films such as Chinna Cinema (2013), Priyathama Neevachata Kushalama (2013) and Eduruleni Alexander (2013). In the year 2014, Jha was seen in Billa Ranga and Maine Pyar Kiya, both in Telugu again. Jha was later cast in a Bollywood movie called Mr. MBA, which is going to be her debut nationwide in India as a lead in the Hindi film industry, alias Bollywood.

Career 
Jha made her acting debut in 2009 with Bollywood the film 3 Idiots, in which she had a minor role of a college student featuring in the song "All Is Well!"  She was not an actor by profession then and left for Dubai as she was on campus, placed by a construction company there. After her Malayalam debut Jha did two Telugu films, namely Kalachakram and Parvathi, which did not release and were shelved. Disappointed by the projects getting shelved, Jha left for Dubai and just when she decided to not indulge in this futility, she was offered two movies in two different languages namely, Nimbe Huli and Ramachari in Kannada and Telugu respectively. Jha was not satisfied with the overall success of both the films owing to the delay in the release dates.

Despite her previous film Nimbe Huli having a delayed release as well as various controversies associated with the same, Jha was offered three movies in the same year, namely Priyathama Neevachata Kushalama, Chinna Cinema, and Eduruleni Alexander. She played diversely different characters of a college girl, the younger version of an old woman and the love interest of a police officer respectively. Thus, she suddenly rose to a place where she started getting public appearances and events regularly. However, in the movie Priyathama Neevachata Kushalama, directed by Trinadh Rao Nakkina and starring opposite Varun Sandesh, Jha was removed from the posters owing to not reciprocating the advances by Sandesh. Jha was way too strong and quoted to The Times of India that she will not let anything pull her down.

Jha took a year break from South Indian film industries to focus on her Bollywood debut. She quoted in an interview that "I have done 8 feature films and still did not get the recognition I deserve; it is time to move away to a better place. One Hindi film is equivalent to 10 regional films." Jha took some time off to work on her singing and scope in the music industry.

Activities 

Apart from acting, Jha writes poetry and publishes poetry on her own website. She has occasionally appeared as a delegate to speak about the current youth issues on some news channels. Jha has worked with the Little Angels Orphanage located in Mumbai to collect funds for them by auctioning her exclusive designer-wear.

Controversies 
Some controversies surrounded Jha. The director of Nimbe Huli complained to the Karnataka Film Chamber of Commerce about Jha before release of the film. As it was stated by her in one of her interviews to Times of India, these controversies stopped her from taking up more assignments in Kannada Film Industry. Reportedly she made an allegation stating she wasn't treated professionally during the filming of the movie, to one of her interviewers from The Times of India.

Also, she alleged that the co-actor Varun Sandesh indecently behaved with her during the filming of the movie Priyathama Neevachata Kushalama. She lamented that he removed her from the posters of the movie on not being reciprocated.

There was news that she was romantically linked with the Indian Cricket captain M. S. Dhoni and a well known Indian actor R. Madhavan too. However she has denied to all these rumors during her interviews to multiple news sources.

Filmography

References

Further reading
 Deccan Chronicle – Komal Jha: The accidental actress
 
 Komal Jha talks to TV9 Kannada about Nimbe Huli (Official YouTube Channel of TV9 Kannada)
 Komal Jha's Facebook Live video beats the news coverage of Missing Egyptian Aircraft on Brazilian TV in number of views
 Nimbe Huli in controversy
 Komal Jha to auction off her designer wears for charity
 Times of India review of Telugu movie Priyathama Neevachata Kushalama
 Times of India review of Telugu movie Eduruleni Alexander
 
 Times of India: Hemant Hegde's Kannada movieNimbe Huli gets Three Star review
 Komal Jha – Exclusive Interview by Ragalahari

External links

Year of birth missing (living people)
Indian film actresses
Indian civil engineers
Indian women engineers
Living people
Actresses from Bihar
Engineers from Bihar
People from Ranchi
21st-century Indian actresses
Actresses in Telugu cinema
Actresses in Kannada cinema
Actresses in Malayalam cinema
Actresses in Hindi cinema
21st-century women engineers